Berrikano (in Spanish Berrícano) is a village and council located in the municipality of Zigoitia, in Álava province, Basque Country, Spain. As of 2020, it has a population of 137.

Geography 
Berrikano is located 12km north-northwest of Vitoria-Gasteiz.

References

Populated places in Álava